Cassinia quinquefaria is a species of flowering plant in the family Asteraceae and is endemic to eastern Australia. It is a shrub with sticky, hairy foliage, linear leaves, and heads of creamy-white flowers arranged in a dense panicle.

Description
The upper surface of the leaves is sticky, the edges are rolled under and the lower surface is covered with fine hairs.

Taxonomy and naming
Cassinia quinquefaria was first formally described in 1818 by Robert Brown in the Transactions of the Linnean Society of London.

Distribution and habitat
This cassinia grows in woodland and forest and is widespread in eastern New South Wales, the Australian Capital Territory and south-eastern Queensland.

References

quinquefaria
Asterales of Australia
Flora of New South Wales
Flora of Queensland
Flora of the Australian Capital Territory
Taxa named by Robert Brown (botanist, born 1773)
Plants described in 1818